Tegus is:

 Tegus, an abbreviation and nickname for the city of Tegucigalpa
 plural of tegu, a common name for the lizard of the same name